Zhijiang High School is also called Zhijiang No.1 High School. It is a high school for senior students in Zhijiang, Hubei, China.

History
The School was founded in 1965.

In 2005, Zhijiang High School built up a new school campus in Jiang Han Road. The area of new campus is about 319.2 mus. The total cost is around 90 million RMB. Currently there are more than 4000 students and teaching staff in the school.

Associations and Clubs
XiaoFan literature club

References

External links
Official website of Zhijiang High School (archive)

High schools in Hubei
Educational institutions established in 1949
1949 establishments in China
Yichang